George Melville Cooper (15 October 1896 – 13 March 1973) was an English actor. His many notable screen roles include the High Sheriff of Nottingham in The Adventures of Robin Hood (1938), Mr. Collins in Pride and Prejudice (1940) and the wedding-rehearsal supervisor Mr. Tringle in Father of the Bride (1950).

Biography
George Melville Cooper was born on 15 October 1896 in Aston, Birmingham, Warwickshire to W.C.J. and Frances (née Brennan) Cooper. He was brought up in Britain and attended public schools, including King Edward's School in Birmingham. He began to develop an interest in acting as a teenager. At the age of eighteen, he made his professional stage debut in a production at Stratford-upon-Avon. His budding acting career was interrupted by his military service in the Scottish regiment during the First World War, in which he was captured on the Western Front and held prisoner by the Germans for a brief time.

After the war, Cooper resumed his stage career, appearing in numerous stage productions, including The Farmer's Wife, Back to Methuselah, The Third Finger and Journey's End. He transitioned to film work in the early 1930s, appearing in Black Coffee (1931) with Austin Trevor and Adrianne Allen, Alexander Korda's The Private Life of Don Juan (1934) with Douglas Fairbanks and Merle Oberon and The Scarlet Pimpernel (1934) with Leslie Howard and Merle Oberon. In 1934, after receiving good reviews for his performance in The Private Life of Don Juan, Cooper moved to the United States.

In Hollywood, Cooper was generally cast as a snobbish, ineffectual society type or as a confidence trickster. His more memorable roles in the 1930s include M. W. Picard in The Great Garrick (1937) with Olivia de Havilland, Bingham the butler in Four's a Crowd (1938) with Errol Flynn and Olivia de Havilland, Boulin in Dramatic School with Luise Rainer and Paulette Goddard, and the cowardly Sheriff of Nottingham in The Adventures of Robin Hood (1938) with Errol Flynn and Olivia de Havilland. During the 1940s, Cooper continued to appear in some of the more popular films of the decade, including Alfred Hitchcock's Rebecca (1940) with Joan Fontaine, Pride and Prejudice (1940) with Greer Garson, The Lady Eve (1941) and You Belong to Me (1941) with Barbara Stanwyck and Henry Fonda, This Above All (1942) with Joan Fontaine, Random Harvest (1942) with Greer Garson, Henry Hathaway's 13 Rue Madeleine (1947) with James Cagney and The Red Danube (1949) with Walter Pidgeon.  Cooper also appeared in Harvey, with James Stewart.

In the 1950s, he continued to appear in popular feature films, such as Father of the Bride (1950), It Should Happen to You (1954), and Around the World in 80 Days (1956), his second supporting role in an Academy Award winning film. In addition to his film work throughout the decade, Cooper appeared in numerous television series, including Musical Comedy Time (1950–51), Fireside Theatre (1951), Kraft Television Theatre (1952), Robert Montgomery Presents (1952–53), Broadway Television Theatre (1952–53), Schlitz Playhouse of Stars (1954), Lux Video Theatre (1951–55), The Red Skelton Show (1956), Studio 57 (1957), Playhouse 90 (1957), Alfred Hitchcock Presents (1957), Shirley Temple's Storybook (1958), and Whirlybirds (1959). Cooper's final television appearance was on The Best of the Post (1961).

Towards the end of his career, Cooper focused on stage work and appeared in such productions as Much Ado About Nothing (1952), Escapade (1953), My Fair Lady (1956–62) and Hostile Witness (1966). Cooper's final acting role was Brassett in the revival of Charley's Aunt, which closed on 11 July 1970.

After a brief first marriage to Gladys Grice that ended in divorce, Cooper married actress Rita Page. Their marriage produced one child and ended with her death in London on 19 December 1954. Cooper's third marriage to Elizabeth Sutherland lasted until his death.

Cooper died of cancer on 13 March 1973 in Los Angeles, California. He was buried in Valhalla Memorial Park Cemetery in Los Angeles.

Filmography

 Black Coffee (1931) as Inspector Japp
 The Calendar (1931) as Mr. Wayne
 Wives Beware (1932) as Mack
 To Brighton with Gladys (1933) as Slingby
 Forging Ahead (1933) as Smedley
 Leave It to Me (1933) as Honorable Freddie
 The Private Life of Don Juan (1934) as Leporello
 The Scarlet Pimpernel (1934) as Romney
 The Bishop Misbehaves (1935) as Collins
 Rendezvous (1935) as Doorman (uncredited)
 The Gorgeous Hussy (1936) as Cuthbert
 The Last of Mrs. Cheyney (1937) as William
 Personal Property (1937) (scenes cut)
 Thin Ice (1937) as Krantz
 The Great Garrick (1937) as M. Picard
 Tovarich (1937) as Charles Dupont
 Women Are Like That (1938) as Mainwaring
 The Adventures of Robin Hood (1938) as High Sheriff of Nottingham
 Gold Diggers in Paris (1938) as Pierre aka Fernand LeBrec
 Four's a Crowd (1938) as Bingham
 Garden of the Moon (1938) as Maurice
 Hard to Get (1938) as Case
 Comet Over Broadway (1938) as Emerson
 Dramatic School (1938) as Boulin
 The Dawn Patrol (1938) as Sgt. Watkins
 I'm from Missouri (1939) as Hearne
 Blind Alley (1939) as George Curtis
 The Sun Never Sets (1939) as Cosey
 Two Bright Boys (1939) as Hilary Harrington 
 Too Many Husbands (1940) as Peter
 Rebecca (1940) as Coroner
 Escape to Glory (1940) as Ship's Mate Penney
 Pride and Prejudice (1940) as Mr. Collins
 Murder Over New York (1940) as Herbert Fenton
 The Lady Eve (1941) as Gerald
 Scotland Yard (1941) as Dr. Crownfield
 The Flame of New Orleans (1941) as Brother-in-Law
 You Belong to Me (1941) as Moody
 This Above All (1942) as Wilbur
 The Affairs of Martha (1942) as Dr. Clarence Sommerfield
 Life Begins at Eight-Thirty (1942) as Barty
 Random Harvest (1942) as George
 Immortal Sergeant (1943) as Pilcher
 Hit Parade of 1943 (1943) as Bradley Cole
 Holy Matrimony (1943) as Dr. Caswell
My Kingdom for a Cook (1943) as Angus Sheffield (uncredited)
 13 Rue Madeleine (1946) as Pappy Simpson
 Heartbeat (1946) as Roland Latour
 The Imperfect Lady (1947) as Lord Montglyn
 Enchantment (1948) as Jones, the Jeweler
 The Red Danube (1949) as Private David Moonlight
 Love Happy (1949) as Throckmorton
 And Baby Makes Three (1949) as Gibson, Fletcher's Butler
 Father of the Bride (1950) as Mr. Tringle
 The Underworld Story (1950) as Maj. Redford
 The Petty Girl (1950) as Beardsley
 Let's Dance (1950) as Charles Wagstaffe
 It Should Happen to You (1954) as Guest Panelist #4
 Moonfleet (1955) as Felix Ratsey
 The King's Thief (1955) as Henry Wynch
 Diane (1956) as 1st Court Physician
 Around the World in 80 Days (1956) as Mr. Talley - Steward R.M.S 'Mongolia'
 Bundle of Joy (1956) as Adams, the Butler
 The Story of Mankind (1957) as Major Domo
 From the Earth to the Moon (1958) as Bancroft

Radio appearances

References

External links

Deaths from cancer in California
English male film actors
English male stage actors
English male television actors
People from Birmingham, West Midlands
1896 births
1973 deaths
20th-century English male actors
English expatriates in the United States
Burials at Valhalla Memorial Park Cemetery
British expatriate male actors in the United States
British Army personnel of World War I
Seaforth Highlanders officers
British World War I prisoners of war
World War I prisoners of war held by Germany